The following is a timeline of the presidency of Donald Trump during the third quarter of 2017, from July 1 to September 30, 2017. To navigate between quarters, see timeline of the Donald Trump presidency.

Overview

Economy

Real GDP growth increased at an annual rate of 3.2%, despite a particularly bad 2017 Atlantic hurricane season. This was due to an increase in consumer spending, private inventory investment, non-residential fixed investment, increased exports, decreased imports, and increased federal government spending. This gain was offset by residential fixed investment and local government spending.

Public opinion

According to FiveThirtyEight, President Trump concluded this quarter with an approval rating of 38.6%, representing a quarterly decline of 1%, and a decline of 6.9% since his inauguration.

Timeline

July 2017

August 2017

September 2017

See also
 Presidential transition of Donald Trump
 First 100 days of Donald Trump's presidency
 List of executive actions by Donald Trump
 List of presidential trips made by Donald Trump (international trips)

Notes

References

2017 Q3
2017 Q3
Presidency of Donald Trump
July 2017 events in the United States
August 2017 events in the United States
September 2017 events in the United States